Klarsfeld is a surname. Notable people with the surname include:

Beate Klarsfeld (born 1939), French-German journalist
Serge Klarsfeld (born 1935), French activist and Nazi hunter